The 2005 Karjala Tournament took place from November 10–13, 2005. Five games were played in Finland and one was played in Sweden. The tournament was part of the 2005-06 Euro Hockey Tour.

Finland won the tournament for eight time in a row, defeating Sverige, 2-1, in the final round.

Final standings

Results

Best players 
The tournament directorate named the following players in the tournament 2005:

 Best goalkeeper:  Fredrik Norrena
 Best defenceman:  Kenny Jönsson
 Best forward:  Andrei Taratukhin

References

External links 
Tournament on hockeyarchives.info

2005–06 Euro Hockey Tour
2005–06 in Swedish ice hockey
2005–06 in Russian ice hockey
2005–06 in Finnish ice hockey
2005–06 in Czech ice hockey
Karjala Tournament
2005
November 2005 sports events in Europe
2000s in Helsinki
Sports competitions in Jönköping